Malkhaz Urjukashvili (born 24 September 1980 in Tbilisi) is a Georgian rugby union player. He plays as a wing.

Career
Urjukashvili moved to France, where he has been playing in Stade Toulousain, RC Nîmes, US Tours, in 2003, Rugby Club Cannes Mandelieu, from 2003/04 to 2006/07, in the Fédérale 2, Stade Aurillacois Cantal Auvergne, from 2007/08 to 2008/09, in the Rugby Pro D2, Groupe Sportife Figeacois, from 2009/10 to 2011/12, and SC Decazeville, since 2012/13, in the Fédérale 2.

He is one of the best players and scorers for Georgia, holding currently 69 caps for his National Team, with 18 tries, 42 conversions, 41 penalties and 1 drop goal, in an aggregate of 313 points. His first match was a 29-15 win over Croatia, in Tbilisi, at 12 October 1997, aged only 17 years old. This made him one of the youngest players ever to be capped at international rugby level.

He was called for the 2003 Rugby World Cup, playing three matches and scoring 2 penalties and 1 drop goal, 9 points in aggregate. In the game against England at Perth, he kicked a long range penalty that was Georgia's first Rugby World Cup points (England eventually won the game 84-6).

He was called once again for the 2007 Rugby World Cup, playing in all the four matches and scoring one conversion. He continued to be a valuable player in the 2011 Rugby World Cup qualification, the third Georgia gained in a row, playing three games and scoring 1 penalty and 1 conversion in the final stage, 5 points on aggregate. He has been absent from his national team since then.

References

External links

1980 births
Living people
Rugby union players from Georgia (country)
Rugby union wings
Expatriate rugby union players from Georgia (country)
Expatriate rugby union players in France
Expatriate sportspeople from Georgia (country) in France
Georgia international rugby union players